, there are 20 undergraduate and 21 post-graduate medical institutes in Nepal whose qualifications are recognized by the Nepal Medical Council, Medical Council of India and World Directory of Medical Schools and are regulated under single government body, Medical Education Commission, Nepal.

Background information 
Medical schools in Nepal are usually known as medical colleges. The history of modern medical education in Nepal is very short. Formal medical education started in Nepal after the establishment of Institute of Medicine, Nepal in 1972 under Tribhuvan University. Previously, only few qualified doctors were present in Nepal before pre-democracy era in 1951. While few eager Nepalese doctors established Nepal Medical Association (NMA) on March 4, 1951 to unite all the practicing doctors. They strongly raised voice to have medical council to regulate the medical practice in Nepal and Nepal Medical Council (NMC) was established on 28 February 1964. However, NMC started functioning after the "NMC-Rules" was approved by His Majesty's Government on 1 January 1968. At present there are only four government funded medical institutes with both UG and PG while two PG institute combined of six public medical institutions in Nepal and a single army funded medical college with both UG and PG.

Types of Medical Institutions

Operational Medical Colleges

Terminated Medical Colleges

Proposed and Under-construction Medical Colleges

See also 
 List of universities and colleges in Nepal
 Ministry of Education
 Ministry of Health

References 

 
Medical colleges
Nepal